Dreamspace is the third studio album by power metal band Stratovarius, released on 9 February 1994 through Noise Records. It is the last Stratovarius album to feature guitarist Timo Tolkki on vocals (after which Timo Kotipelto became the lead singer on 1995's Fourth Dimension), as well as the first to feature bassist Jari Kainulainen.

Critical reception

Steve Huey at AllMusic gave Dreamspace four stars out of five, saying that it "demonstrates the band coming into its own, honing its melodic Euro-metal attack to a razor-sharp point."

Track listing

Personnel
Timo Tolkki – vocals, guitar, engineering, mixing, production
Antti Ikonen – keyboards, computer
Tuomo Lassila – drums (tracks 1, 2, 5, 8–12, 14), percussion, flute
Sami Kuoppamäki – drums (tracks 3, 4, 6, 7, 13)
Jari Kainulainen – bass guitar
Sole – oboe
Mikko Karmila – mixing

References

External links
Dreamspace at stratovarius.com

Stratovarius albums
1994 albums
Noise Records albums